Gary Phil Brandner (May 31, 1930 – September 22, 2013) was an American horror fiction author best known for his werewolf themed trilogy of novels,  The Howling.  The first book of the series was adapted loosely as a motion picture in 1981.  Brandner's second and third Howling novels, published in 1979 and 1985 respectively, have no association with the film series, though he was involved with writing the screenplay for the second Howling film, Howling II: Your Sister Is a Werewolf.  The fourth film of the Howling series, Howling IV: The Original Nightmare, is actually the closest adaptation of Brandner's original novel, though this too varies to some degree.

Brandner's novel Walkers was adapted and filmed for television as From The Dead Of Night. He also wrote the screenplay for the 1988 horror film Cameron's Closet.

Life and career
Born in the Midwest and much traveled during his formative years, Brandner published more than 30 novels, more than 100 short stories, and also wrote a few screenplays.   He attended college  at the University of Washington where he was a member of fraternity Phi Sigma Kappa. After graduating in 1955, he worked as an amateur boxer, bartender, surveyor, loan company investigator, advertising copywriter, and technical writer before turning to fiction writing.  Brandner lived with his wife, Martine Wood Brandner, and several cats in Reno, Nevada.

He died of esophageal cancer in 2013.

Novels

The Big Brain series

The Howling series

Standalones

See also
List of horror fiction authors

References

External links

20th-century American novelists
20th-century American male writers
American horror writers
American male novelists
1930 births
2013 deaths
American male short story writers
People from Sault Ste. Marie, Michigan
Novelists from Michigan
20th-century American short story writers